Thomas Jörg (born December 2, 1981) is a German professional ice hockey forward who currently plays for Augsburger Panther of the Deutsche Eishockey Liga (DEL).

Career statistics

References

External links

1981 births
Living people
Augsburger Panther players
DEG Metro Stars players
ERC Ingolstadt players
German ice hockey forwards
People from Immenstadt
Sportspeople from Swabia (Bavaria)